Joanna McClelland Glass (born October 7, 1936 in Saskatoon, Saskatchewan) is a Canadian playwright. She became an American citizen in 1962.

Plays
1972 Canadian Gothic
1972 American Modern
1975 Artichoke
1980 To Grandmother's House We Go
1983 Play Memory
1989 Yesteryear
1993 If We Are Women
2004 Trying
2008 Palmer Park
2010 Mrs. Dexter and Her Daily

Novels
1975 Reflections on a Mountain Summer (Knopf)
1984 Woman Wanted (St. Martin's)

See also
Woman Wanted, film adapted from novel.

References

Further reading
The Oxford companion to Canadian literature, 2nd ed., pp. 464–466
The Oxford companion to Canadian theatre, pp. 234–235.

External links
 Joanna Glass entry at The Canadian Encyclopedia

1936 births
Living people
Canadian women dramatists and playwrights
Writers from Saskatoon
Canadian emigrants to the United States
20th-century Canadian dramatists and playwrights
21st-century Canadian dramatists and playwrights
20th-century Canadian women writers
21st-century Canadian women writers